Supreme Beings of Leisure (SBL) are an electronic/trip hop band from Los Angeles, California. Current members of SBL are singer/songwriter Geri Soriano-Lightwood, multi-instrumentalist/producer Ramin Sakurai, and guitarist/programmer Rick Torres. SBL was formed from the remains of the band Oversoul 7 in 1998 when they signed to Palm Pictures.

History

In 1996, Oversoul 7 formed with singer Geri Soriano-Lightwood, Ramin Sakurai, bassist Kiran Shahani, and guitarist Rick Torres, and released "Nothing Like Tomorrow" and "What's the Deal" on two compilations on the Moonshine Music dance label. After these Moonshine releases, Oversoul 7 signed a demo deal with A&M Records, recording "Truth From Fiction", "Never the Same", and "Last Girl on Earth", all of which ended up on the band's self-titled debut album, released on the Palm Pictures label. This first Supreme Beings of Leisure album sold over 250,000 units with little promotional touring. Instead, SBL opted to use the internet to market and promote the album, being the first band to do a "Virtual Internet Tour", and among the first to use Flash animation for their videos. "Supreme Beings of Leisure" peaked at #47 on the Billboard Heatseekers chart according to allmusic.com, and was in the top 100 of the Trip-Hop Dance & DJ music category according to Amazon.com sales ranking.

After the release of their debut album, the band split, leaving Geri and Ramin as the main members of SBL. With this lineup, they released the second SBL album, Divine Operating System in 2003. This peaked at #29 on the Billboard Heatseekers chart, #9 on the Top Electronic Albums chart, and #23 on the Top Independent Albums chart (all according to allmusic.com).

In 2003, SBL decided to leave Palm Pictures, taking a two-year hiatus, while releasing various remixes and appearing on other artists' albums during this period.

Supreme Beings of Leisure's third major album, 11i, was released on February 12, 2008, by Rykodisc Records.
Aiming to create a richer, fuller sound than on SBL's first two releases, Geri and Ramin welcomed their touring band into the studio to collaborate on some tracks: Sheldon Strickland (bass), Geoff Brandin (guitar), and Jason Graham (drums). They also broadened their sound with guest musicians including string arranger Scott Tibbs (who has worked with Beyoncé and Mary J. Blige), turntablist DJ Swamp (Beck, Crystal Method, Morcheeba), violin virtuoso Lili Haydn and Megadeth ax-man Marty Friedman.

SBL has earned favorable notices in Rolling Stone, the New York Times, Details, Interview, Elle, Wired, Billboard, Keyboard and Seventeen. They have sold more than 300,000 records.

Use of Supreme Beings of Leisure's music

 "Under the Gun" was featured in the animated movie Animatrix (2003).

Discography

Albums

Singles

References

Trip hop groups
Electronic music groups from California
Musical groups established in 1998
|}